The 1936 East Tennessee State Teachers Buccaneers football team was an American football team that represented State Teachers College, Johnson City—now known as East Tennessee State University (ETSU)—as a member of the Smoky Mountain Conference in the 1936 college football season. They were led by fifth-year head coach Gene McMurray.

Schedule

References

East Tennessee State Teachers
East Tennessee State Buccaneers football seasons
East Tennessee State Teachers Buccaneers football